Romemu is a Jewish prayer community on the Upper West Side of Manhattan.  It was founded by Rabbi David Ingber in March 2006. Romemu holds Shabbat and holiday services and adult education courses and runs the Seekers Hebrew School.

Romemu describes itself as "a welcoming, experiential, irreverently pious, intergenerational Jewish community that elevates and transforms individuals and communities into more compassionate human beings," and seeks to expand spiritual engagement in Jewish religious practices.  The organization is part of the Jewish Renewal movement, and has over 1,500 members.

In 2019, the organization launched an annual summer yeshiva program, Romemu Yeshiva, offering what it described as a "neo-Hasidic" yeshiva experience merging spirituality, mysticism, and meditation with traditional text study.

Romemu is a member of the Jewish Emergent Network.

References

Synagogues in Manhattan
2006 establishments in New York City
Jewish Renewal
Anti-vaccination in the United States